Realist evaluation or realist review (also realist synthesis) is a type of theory-driven evaluation method used in evaluating social programmes. It is based on the epistemological foundations of critical realism. Based on specific theories, realist evaluation provides an alternative lens to empiricist evaluation techniques for the study and understanding of programmes and policies. This technique assumes that knowledge is a social and historical product, thus the social and political context as well as theoretical mechanisms, need consideration in analysis of programme or policy effectiveness.

Realist evaluation techniques recognise that there are many interwoven variables operative at different levels in society, thus this evaluation method suits complex social interventions, rather than traditional cause-effect, non-contextual methods of analysis. This realist technique acknowledges that intervention programmes and policy changes do not necessarily work for everyone, since people are different and are embedded in different contexts.

Realist evaluation was popularised by the work of Ray Pawson and Nick Tilley in 1997. They described the procedure followed in the implementation of realist evaluation techniques in programme evaluation and emphasise that once hypotheses have been generated and data collected, the outcomes of the programme are explored, focusing on the groups that the programme benefitted and those who did not benefit. Effectiveness of a programme is thus not dependent on the outcomes alone (cause–effect), rather there is a consideration of the theoretical mechanisms that are applied, and the socio-historical context in which the programmes were implemented. Thus, the final explanation of a programme considers context-mechanism-outcome.

References 

Evaluation methods
Evidence-based practices
Information science
Meta-analysis
Systematic review